Rosa omeiensis is a species of Rosa native to central and southwestern China in the provinces of Gansu, Guizhou, Hubei, Ningxia, Qinghai, Shaanxi, Sichuan, Xizang, and Yunnan; it grows in mountains at altitudes of 700 to 4,400 m.

It is a shrub which grows 4 m tall, and is often very spiny. The leaves are deciduous, 3–6 cm long, with 5–13 leaflets with a serrated margin. The flowers are 2.5–3.5 cm diameter, white, with (unusually for a rose) only four petals. The hips are red to orange-yellow, 8–15 mm diameter, with persistent sepals, and often bristly.

There are four formae:
Rosa omeiensis f. omeiensis.
Rosa omeiensis f. glandulosa T.T.Yü & T.C.Ku.
Rosa omeiensis f. paucijuga T.T.Yü & T.C.Ku.
Rosa omeiensis f. pteracantha Rehder & E.H.Wilson.

It is sometimes treated as a subspecies of the closely related species Rosa sericea.

Cultivation and uses
Rosa omeiensis forma pteracantha is grown as an ornamental plant for its large, bright red thorns.

References

Flora of China: Rosa omeiensis

omeiensis
Flora of China
Flora of Asia